Charles Dealtry Locock (27 September 1862 – 13 May 1946) was a British literary scholar, editor and translator, who wrote on a wide array of subjects, including chess, billiards and croquet. He translated numerous Swedish plays and books of poetry.

Life and career 
Charles Dealtry Locock was born September 27, 1862 in Brighton, England.  He was educated at Oxford University, and then published several works on the romantic poet Percy Bysshe Shelley. He was a skilled chess player, winning the British Amateur Championship in 1887  and writing extensively on the game. From 1904 until 1915 he was the editor of the Croquet Association Gazette. Locock translated several Swedish authors, including the poets Esaias Tegnér and Gustaf Fröding and the playwright August Strindberg. His translation of the Strindberg play "The Dance of Death" was used in the 1969 film adaptation starring Laurence Olivier. He died May 13, 1946 in London.

C. D. Locock and his American contemporary, Charles Wharton Stork, published several volumes of Swedish poetry in translation. Among the authors they covered were Gustaf Fröding, Erik Axel Karlfeldt, Birger Sjöberg and August Strindberg.

Selected works 
Side and Screw 1901
Modern Croquet Tactics 1907
Olympian Echoes 1908
The Poems of Percy Bysshe Shelley 1911
120 Chess Problems and Puzzles 1912

Selected translations 
Thirty-two passages from the Iliad 1922
Thirty-two passages from the Odyssey 1923
Fritiof's Saga by Esaias Tegnér 1924 
Guitar and Concertina by Gustaf Fröding 1925 
Modern Swedish Poetry Pt. 1 1929
Easter and other plays by August Strindberg 1929
Lucky Peter's Travels and other plays by August Strindberg 1930
Master Olof and other plays by August Strindberg 1931
Modern Swedish Poetry Pt. 2 1936

References

External links 

 

1862 births
1946 deaths
Alumni of the University of Oxford
British writers
20th-century translators

English croquet players